Angali Pangali is a 2016 Indian Tamil-language romantic comedy film directed by S. Balamurugan. The film stars Vishnu Priyan, Sanyathara and Soori, and was released on 17 June 2016.

Plot

Cast 

 Vishnu Priyan
 Sanyathara
 Soori
 Delhi Ganesh
 Meera Krishnan
 Andipatti Vellapandian Thevar
 Anjali Devi
 Visalini
 Jyothi
 Jennifer
 Kottachi
 Gerald
 Dindigul Alex
 Madurai Velmurugan
 Baby Vinitha

Production 
The film was initially titled Ellam Neeyaanai but was changed to Angali Pangali during the post-production phase. The film's producers held an audio launch event during May 2014 to release the film's soundtrack. However, the film went through a two-year delay before having a theatrical release during June 2016.

Soundtrack 
The music composed by Srikanth Deva.

References

External links 

2010s Tamil-language films
2016 directorial debut films
2016 films
2016 romantic comedy films
Films scored by Srikanth Deva
Indian romantic comedy films